Old Gravesend Cemetery is a historic cemetery at Gravesend Neck Road and McDonald Avenue in Gravesend, Brooklyn, New York, New York. The cemetery was founded about 1658 and contains the graves of a number of the original patentees and their families.  Lady Deborah Moody, founder of Gravesend, is believed to be buried in the cemetery.

It was listed on the National Register of Historic Places in 1980.

See also 
 List of New York City Landmarks
 National Register of Historic Places listings in Kings County, New York

References

External links

 

Cemeteries on the National Register of Historic Places in New York City
Cemeteries in Brooklyn
New York City Designated Landmarks in Brooklyn
National Register of Historic Places in Brooklyn